Ahad Ali Sarker is a Bangladesh Awami League politician and the former State Minister of Youth and Sports.

Early life 
Ahad was born on 3 January 1952. He has a B.A. degree.

Career 
Ahad was elected to parliament in 2008 from Natore-2 as a Bangladesh Awami League candidate. He is the vice-president of the Natore Awami League unit. In February 2016, his home in Natore was attacked by activists of Bangladesh Jubo League. On 9 July 2019, his rally was attacked by Jubo League activists.

References

Awami League politicians
Living people
State Ministers of Youth and Sports (Bangladesh)
9th Jatiya Sangsad members
1952 births